Jean-Marc Dalpé  (born February 21, 1957) is a Canadian playwright and poet. He is one of the most important figures in Franco-Ontarian literature.

Dalpé studied theatre at the University of Ottawa, graduating in 1973. In 1979, he obtained graduate diploma from the Conservatoire d'art dramatique de Québec. He subsequently worked with several Franco-Ontarian theatre companies, including as a co-founder of Ottawa's Théâtre de la Vieille 17 in 1979. He was also associated with the Théâtre du Nouvel-Ontario in Sudbury for several years, writing many of his early works there and publishing them with that city's Prise de parole publishing house. He returned to the University of Ottawa in 1987 as writer in residence, and was a grant adjudicator for the Canada Council the following year.

In 1990, he was writer in residence at the Festival des Francophonies in Limoges, France, and in 1993 at Montreal's Nouvelle Compagnie Théâtrale.

He won the Governor General's Award on three occasions.

On April 5, 2021, Dalpé renounced the honorary doctorate he had been given at Laurentian University to protest against severe cuts the university had made to its programs, including the French-language theatre BA.

Works
 Hawkesbury blues, 1982
 Nickel, 1983-1984 (co-written with Brigitte Haentjens)
 Les Rogers, 1985
 Le Chien ("The Dog"), 1988 - winner of the 1988 Governor General's Award for French Drama
 Les Murs de nos villages ("The Walls of Our Villages"), 1993
 Eddy, 1994 - winner of the Prix du Nouvel-Ontario and the Prix Le Droit
 Lucky Lady, 1995
 Il n'y a que l'amour ("There is Nothing But Love"), 1999
 Contes urbains d'Ottawa ("Urban Stories of Ottawa"), 1999
 Piégés ("Trapped"), 2000
 Un Vent se lève qui éparpille ("Scattered in a Rising Wind"), 2000 - winner of the 2000 Governor General's Award for French Fiction
 Contes sudburois ("Stories of Sudbury"), 2001
 Août: un repas à la campagne, 2006

References

1957 births
Living people
Franco-Ontarian people
Writers from Ottawa
Canadian poets in French
Governor General's Award-winning fiction writers
Governor General's Award-winning dramatists
University of Ottawa alumni
Canadian male poets
Canadian male novelists
Canadian novelists in French
Canadian dramatists and playwrights in French
Canadian male dramatists and playwrights
Members of the Order of Canada
20th-century Canadian dramatists and playwrights
21st-century Canadian dramatists and playwrights
20th-century Canadian poets
21st-century Canadian poets
20th-century Canadian male writers
21st-century Canadian male writers
20th-century Canadian novelists
21st-century Canadian novelists